Svorksjøen is a lake in Trøndelag county, Norway. The  lake lies on the border of the municipalities of Melhus and Orkland.

The water flows out of the lake into the river Svorka which in turn flows into the river Orkla.

See also
List of lakes in Norway

References

Lakes of Trøndelag
Melhus
Orkland